Nectria coccinea is a fungal plant pathogen. The variant Nectria coccinea var. faginata causes beech bark disease, and can infect the tree via the feeding holes made by the beech scale insect Cryptococcus fagisuga.

References

External links

Fungal tree pathogens and diseases
coccinea